The 1989 NCAA Division I men's basketball tournament involved 64 schools playing in single-elimination play to determine the national champion of men's  NCAA Division I college basketball. It began on March 16, 1989, and ended with the championship game on April 3 in Seattle. A total of 63 games were played.

Michigan, coached by Steve Fisher, won the national title with an 80–79 overtime victory in the final game over Seton Hall, coached by P. J. Carlesimo. Glen Rice of Michigan set an NCAA tournament record by scoring 184 points in six games and was named the tournament's Most Outstanding Player.

Just prior to the start of this tournament, Michigan coach Bill Frieder had announced that he would accept the head coaching position at Arizona State University at the end of the season. Michigan athletic director Bo Schembechler promptly fired Frieder and appointed top assistant Fisher as interim coach, stating famously, that "a Michigan man is going to coach a Michigan team."

Two 16-seeded teams came within one point of victory in the first round (Georgetown vs. Princeton, Oklahoma vs. East Tennessee State), and a third came within six points. This tournament was also unusual in that all four 11-seeds advanced out of the first round.

The 1989 Tournament was the second one since 1980, with 1987 being the first, in which the defending national champion did not participate in the tournament. Kansas, winner of the 1988 NCAA title, had been placed on probation for violations committed by former coach Larry Brown and was barred from the tournament. Brown left Kansas immediately after winning the national championship to return to coaching in the NBA with the San Antonio Spurs, leaving first-year coach Roy Williams to coach the team. It is the only time the Jayhawks have missed the NCAA tournament from 1984 to the present day. The defending champion would not be left out of the next year's tournament again until 2008. The tournament was notable for the poor performance of the SEC.  After traditional stalwart Kentucky missed the postseason after experiencing its first losing season since 1927, none of the five SEC teams won a game in the tournament.

Schedule and venues

The following are the sites that were selected to host each round of the 1989 tournament, and their hosts:

First and Second Rounds
March 16 and 18
East Region
 Greensboro Coliseum, Greensboro, North Carolina (Host: Atlantic Coast Conference)
Midwest Region
 Hoosier Dome, Indianapolis, Indiana (Hosts: Butler University, Midwestern Collegiate Conference)
Southeast Region
 Memorial Gymnasium, Nashville, Tennessee (Host: Vanderbilt University)
West Region
 BSU Pavilion, Boise, Idaho (Host: Boise State University)
March 17 and 19
East Region
 Providence Civic Center, Providence, Rhode Island (Host: Providence College)
Midwest Region
 Reunion Arena, Dallas, Texas (Host: Southwest Conference)
Southeast Region
 Omni Coliseum, Atlanta, Georgia (Host: Georgia Tech)
West Region
 McKale Center, Tucson, Arizona (Host: University of Arizona)

Regional semifinals and finals (Sweet Sixteen and Elite Eight)
March 23 and 25
Southeast Regional, Rupp Arena, Lexington, Kentucky (Host: University of Kentucky)
West Regional, McNichols Sports Arena, Denver, Colorado (Hosts: University of Colorado Boulder, Big 8 Conference)
March 24 and 26
East Regional, Brendan Byrne Arena, East Rutherford, New Jersey (Hosts: Seton Hall University, Big East Conference)
Midwest Regional, Hubert H. Humphrey Metrodome, Minneapolis, Minnesota (Host: University of Minnesota)

National semifinals and championship (Final Four and championship)
April 1 and 3
Kingdome, Seattle, Washington (Host: University of Washington)

The Kingdome was the host city of the Final Four for the second time in six years. Once again, all four venues in the regional rounds were former or future Final Four venues. For the first time since 1964, there were no new host cities or venues used for the tournament. Additionally, no venues were retired after this year.

Teams

Bracket
* – Denotes overtime period

East Regional – East Rutherford, New Jersey

First round summary

Second round summary

Regional Semi-final summary

Regional Final summary

West Regional – Denver, Colorado

First round summary

Second round summary

Regional Semi-final summary

Regional Final summary

Southeast Regional – Lexington, Kentucky

First round summary

Second round summary

Regional Semi-final summary

Regional Final summary

Midwest Regional – Minneapolis

First round summary

Second round summary

Regional Semi-final summary

Regional Final summary

Final Four – Seattle

(* – Denotes Overtime)

Game summaries

National Championship

Announcers

Television
CBS Sports
Jim Nantz & James Brown served as studio hosts.
Brent Musburger and Billy Packer – First round (DePaul–Memphis State) at Boise, Idaho; Second Round at Indianapolis, Indiana and Atlanta, Georgia; East Regionals at East Rutherford, New Jersey; Final Four at Seattle, Washington
Dick Stockton and Bill Raftery – Second Round at Greensboro, North Carolina and Dallas, Texas; West Regionals at Denver, Colorado
Tim Brant and Len Elmore – Second Round at Boise, Idaho; Southeast Regionals at Lexington, Kentucky
Verne Lundquist and Tom Heinsohn – First round (Louisiana State–UTEP) and Second Round at Tucson, Arizona; Midwest Regionals at Minneapolis, Minnesota
Steve Zabriskie and Curry Kirkpatrick – Second Round at Nashville, Tennessee
Greg Gumbel and Quinn Buckner – Second Round at Providence, Rhode Island
ESPN and NCAA Productions
Tim Brando (NCAA Tournament Today) and John Saunders (NCAA Tournament Tonight) served as studio hosts and Dick Vitale served as studio analyst.
Bob Carpenter and Quinn Buckner – First round (South Carolina–North Carolina State) & (Notre Dame–Vanderbilt) at Providence, Rhode Island
Mike Gorman and Ron Perry – First round (Rutgers–Iowa) & (Princeton–Georgetown) at Providence, Rhode Island
Mike Patrick and Dan Bonner – First round (Minnesota–Kansas State) & (South Carolina State–Duke) at Greensboro, North Carolina
Bob Rathbun and Bucky Waters – First round (Siena–Stanford) & (Tennessee–West Virginia) at Greensboro, North Carolina
Tom Hammond and Clark Kellogg – First round (UALR–Louisville) & (Ball State–Pittsburgh) at Indianapolis, Indiana
Mick Hubert and Jim Gibbons – First round (Loyola Marymount–Arkansas) & (McNeese State–Illinois) at Indianapolis, Indiana
Ron Franklin and Billy King – First round (Texas–Georgia Tech) at Dallas, Texas
Frank Fallon and Bob Ortegel – First round (Colorado State–Florida), (Creighton–Missouri), & (Syracuse–Bucknell) at Dallas, Texas
Wayne Larrivee and Jack Givens – First round (Louisiana Tech–LaSalle) & (Middle Tennessee State–Florida State) at Nashville, Tennessee
John Sanders and Gary Thompson – First round (East Tennessee State–Oklahoma) & (Providence–Virginia) at Nashville, Tennessee
Ralph Hacker and Dan Belluomini – First round (Xavier–Michigan) & (Iowa State–UCLA) at Atlanta, Georgia
Fred White and Larry Conley – First round (South Alabama–Alabama) & (Southern–North Carolina) at Atlanta, Georgia
Brad Nessler and Irv Brown – First round (Robert Morris–Arizona) & (Idaho–UNLV) at Boise, Idaho
Ted Robinson and – First round (Clemson–Saint Mary's) at Boise, Idaho
Pete Solomon and Bob Elliott – First round (Evansville–Oregon State) at Tucson, Arizona
Barry Tompkins and Bruce Larson – First round (SW Missouri State–Seton Hall) & (George Mason–Indiana) at Tucson, Arizona

Radio

First and second rounds
CBS Radio

Regionals
 – East Regionals at East Rutherford, New Jersey
 – Midwest Regionals at Minneapolis, Minnesota
 – Southeast Regionals at Lexington, Kentucky
Ted Robinson and – West Regionals at Denver, Colorado

Final Four
 – at Seattle, Washington

Legacy
The story of the Wolverines' success was cited as inspiration in another sport. When the Spain national football team manager Julen Lopetegui was sacked days before the 2018 FIFA World Cup started after agreeing to join Real Madrid after the tournament, Spanish defender Gerard Piqué drew parallels with Michigan's NCAA win amid similar circumstances.  Unfortunately, Spain failed to advance beyond the round of 16 while France won the tournament.

See also
 1989 NCAA Division II men's basketball tournament
 1989 NCAA Division III men's basketball tournament
 1989 NCAA Division I women's basketball tournament
 1989 NCAA Division II women's basketball tournament
 1989 NCAA Division III women's basketball tournament
 1989 National Invitation Tournament
 1989 National Women's Invitation Tournament
 1989 NAIA Division I men's basketball tournament
 1989 NAIA Division I women's basketball tournament

References

NCAA Division I men's basketball tournament
Naia
Basketball in the Dallas–Fort Worth metroplex
Basketball competitions in Seattle
NCAA Division I men's basketball tournament
NCAA Division I men's basketball tournament
1980s in Seattle
NCAA Division I men's basketball tournament